The 2010 GP Stad Roeselare was the 7th running of the women's GP Stad Roeselare, a women's bicycle race in Belgium. It was rated by the UCI as a 1.1 category race.

Results

s.t. = same time
Source

References

See also
2010 in women's road cycling

2010 in women's road cycling
2010 in Belgian sport
GP Stad Roeselare